The King of Kings World Tour is the name of the world tour by reggaeton singer Don Omar to promote his second studio album King of Kings. During the concerts in Puerto Rico it was recorded and later released as the CD and DVD King of Kings: Live.

Background 
As of 2006, having sold over 1 million copies of his first 2 albums. The Last Don and The Last Don Live, including 340,000 copies in the United States, Don Omar released his much anticipated second studio album. King of Kings entered at No. 7 with becoming the highest charting debut by a reggaeton artist. In just few weeks it sold over 160,000 copies in US.  It eventually sold more than 4 millions of copies worldwide. In October 2006, Billboard announced the tour in an article. It also announced that the cost of the staging the tour was estimated at two million dollars. with a massive stage production complete with elaborate pyrotechnics and full-blown theatrical and dance elements.

Commercial reception 
Tickets prices in the United States were between $35 and $95. The Puerto Rico concerts were sold out. 

In Chile, the media reported 80,000 fans at the concert and over 20,000 in Argentina. In Venezuela, 125,000 fans were reported at his concert in Barquisimeto, a record for the highest attendance for a show in the country.

The tour was producer by Latin Entertainment Group and sponsored for Verizon in 2006. The King of Kings Tour was multi-million dollar.

Critical reception 
Agustin Gurza from the Los Angeles Times gave the concert a positive review claiming "Don Omar takes reggaeton higher"

Tour dates

Notes

References 

2006 concert tours
2007 concert tours
Don Omar concert tours